Maja Matevžič (born 13 June 1980) is a former professional  tennis player from Slovenia. Both her most recent WTA Tour singles and doubles matches were played on 21 August 2005 at Toronto.

She retired because of injuries in September 2006. Her last tournament was in Portorož, Slovenia, where she played doubles with Tina Križan.

Maja wanted to open a tennis school in Slovenia. She would like pass on her knowledge to boys and girls in her country.

WTA career finals

Singles: 1 (1 title)

Doubles: 3 (2 titles, 1 runner-up)

ITF Circuit finals

Singles: 7 (4–3)

Doubles: 12 (5–7)

External links
 
 
 
 

1980 births
Slovenian female tennis players
Living people
Sportspeople from Ljubljana
Olympic tennis players of Slovenia